The Sailor is the 1979 album by singer-songwriter Mickey Newbury. The album features a contemporary country production style.

The Sailor was collected for CD issue on the eight-disc Mickey Newbury Collection from Mountain Retreat, Newbury's own label in the mid-1990s, along with nine other Newbury albums from 1969–1981.

Track listing 
All tracks composed by Mickey Newbury
"Blue Sky Shinin'" - 2:54
"Let's Have a Party" - 3:17
"There's a Part of Her Still Holding On Somehow" - 2:53
"A Weed is a Weed" - 2:21
"Let It Go" - 2:48
"Looking for the Sunshine" - 3:15
"Darlin' Take Care of Yourself" - 3:02
"Long Gone" - 2:43
"The Night You Wrote That Song" - 3:37

Personnel 
Mickey Newbury
Barry "Byrd" Burton, Billy Sanford, Bobby Thompson, Don Roth, Rafe Van Hoy, Ray Edenton, John Goldthwaite – guitar
Bob Moore – bass
Buddy Spicher – fiddle
Bobby Thompson – banjo
Bobby Wood, John Moore – keyboards
Jerry Carrigan – drums
Mark Morris – percussion
Jay Patten – saxophone
Terry McMillan – harmonica
Dennis Wilson, Diane Tidwell, Don Gant, Duane West, Ginger Holladay, John Moore, Lea Jane Berinati, Lisa Silver, Sheri Kramer, Thomas Brannon – backing vocals
Carl Gorodetzky, Gary Vanosdale, George Binkley, John Catchings, Karl L. Polen, Jr., Lennie Haight, Marvin Chantry, Pamela Vanosdale, Roy Christensen, Samuel Terranova, Sheldon Kurland, Steven Smith, Virginia Christensen, Wilfred Lehmen – strings
Alan Moore – string arrangements
Technical
Billy Sherrill, Lee Hazen, Lynn Peterzell – engineers
Stuart Kusher – art direction
Gene Brownell – photography

References 

 

Mickey Newbury albums
1979 albums
Elektra Records albums